Ahmed Rasheed may refer to:

 Ahmed Rasheed (footballer), Maldivian footballer
 Ahmed Rasheed (cricketer), Pakistani first class cricketer